Warren Steen (July 22, 1940 in Winnipeg, Manitoba – August 19, 2009) was a politician in Manitoba, Canada.  He served as a member of the Legislative Assembly of Manitoba from 1975 to 1986, as a Progressive Conservative.

Biography 

The son of Manley Steen, he was educated at the University of Winnipeg. Steen was executive assistant for Manitoba Minister of Agriculture George Hutton from 1962 to 1963. He served as an alderman in the old city of Winnipeg from 1970 to 1971, and as a Councillor in the amalgamated city from 1971 to 1975.

He was first elected to the Manitoba legislature in a 1975 by-election in the central Winnipeg riding of Crescentwood, defeating Liberal leader Charles Huband by 169 votes (the former MLA, New Democrat Harvey Patterson, finished third).  Two years later, in the general election of 1977, he retained the seat against New Democrat Muriel Smith by 72 votes, with Huband dropping to third place.  The Progressive Conservatives won this election, although Steen was not called to join the cabinet of Premier Sterling Lyon.

The Progressive Conservatives were defeated in the 1981 election, although ironically Steen was re-elected in the riding of River Heights by an increased majority.  He retained his seat until the 1986 provincial election, when he was defeated by new Liberal leader Sharon Carstairs (it may be noted that this was the only seat won by the Liberal Party in this election).  He did not attempt a return to provincial politics after this time.

After leaving politics, Steen worked in the insurance industry as a life underwriter.

He died at the St. Boniface Hospital in Winnipeg at the age of 69.

His brother Robert was also a member of the Manitoba assembly and served as Winnipeg mayor.

References 

1940 births
2009 deaths
Winnipeg city councillors
Progressive Conservative Party of Manitoba MLAs